The 1968 Lower Hutt mayoral election was part of the New Zealand local elections held that same year. The elections were held for the role of Mayor of Lower Hutt plus other local government positions including fifteen city councillors, also elected triennially. The polling was conducted using the standard first-past-the-post electoral method.

Background
The incumbent Mayor, Percy Dowse, sought re-election for a seventh term. He was opposed by Citizens' Association councillor Dave Hadley. Initially John Kennedy-Good was favoured as the Citizens' mayoral candidate, but as he had in 1965, he refused to challenge Dowse. Additionally he cited his intention to stand for parliament as the National Party candidate for the Hutt electorate at the upcoming 1969 general election as being incompatible with the mayoralty. Dowse, who was returned unopposed in the previous election, had a large reduction in his majority. The Labour Party lost its majority on the council (three sitting councillors lost their seats) with a large swing to Citizens' candidates.

Mayoral results

Councillor results

Notes

References

Mayoral elections in Lower Hutt
1968 elections in New Zealand
Politics of the Wellington Region